Andrew Bromfield is a British editor and translator of Russian works. He is a founding editor of the Russian literature journal Glas, and has translated into English works by Boris Akunin, Vladimir Voinovich, Irina Denezhkina, Victor Pelevin, and Sergei Lukyanenko, among other writers.

Bibliography (as a translator)
Victor Pelevin
Stories and novellas
"The Blue Lantern"
"Bulldozer Driver's Day"
"Crystal World"
"Hermit and Six-Toes"
"The Life and Adventures of Shed Number XII"
"Mid-Game"
"News from Nepal"
"Nika"
"The Ontology of Childhood"
"Prince of Gosplan"
"Sleep"
"Tai Shou Chuan USSR (A Chinese folk tale)"
"The Tambourine of the Upper World"
"The Tarzan Swing"
"Vera Pavlovna's Ninth Dream"
"A Werewolf Problem In Central Russia"
"The Yellow Arrow"
Novels
"The Life of Insects"
"Omon Ra"
"Clay Machine Gun" ("Chapayev and Void", "Buddhas Little Finger")
"Homo Zapiens" ("Babylon", "Generation "П")
"The Helmet of Horror: The Myth of Theseus and the Minotaur"
"The Sacred Book Of The Werewolf"

Dmitry Glukhovsky
"Metro 2034"
"Metro 2035"

Boris Akunin
"The Winter Queen"
"Murder on the Leviathan"
"The Turkish Gambit"
"The Death of Achilles"
"Special Assignments"
"The State Counsellor"
"The Coronation (novel)"
"Pelagia and the White Bulldog"
"Pelagia and the Black Monk"
"Pelagia and the Red Rooster"

Sergei Lukyanenko
"Night Watch"
"Day Watch"
"Twilight Watch"
"Last Watch"
"The New Watch"
"Sixth Watch"

Mikhail Bulgakov
"Dead Man's Memoir"
"Dog's Heart"

Other works
"Incidences" by Daniil Kharms
"Very Short Stories" by Genrikh Sapgir
"Monday Starts on Saturday" by Boris and Arkady Strugatsky
"Rachmaninov" by Nikolai Bazhanov
"The Law of Eternity" by Nodar Dumbadze and Mikhail Krakovsky
"War and Peace" by Leo Tolstoy
"Glas: New Russian Writing" magazine (ed. by Natalia Perova)
"Lizka and Her Men" by Alexander Ikonnikov
"The Good Angel of Death" by Andrey Kurkov
"Maxim and Fyodor" by Vladimir Shinkarev
"Reasons for Living" by Dmitry Bakin
"Witch's Tears" by Nina Sadur
"Headcrusher (novel)" by Alexander Garros and Aleksei Evdokimov

Bromfield about his work
"With two languages as different as Russian and English, even many of the basic forms of language cannot be rendered in a simplistically 'literal' manner. But my effort is always directed to 'recreating the author' in English, not to authoring a text of my own. I'm not one of those translators who think that the translator owns the text and can remodel it to suit himself."

"My job is to provide the readers of a translation with an experience which is as close as possible to the experience that the author provides to readers of the original — the author's authentic voice and relationship to his characters (and readers) should come across in the same way in a translation. Also, the translated text should, ideally, read just as naturally as the original (and conversely, if an author doesn't read comfortably in the original, that should be reflected in the translation)."

"After the effort of coming up with appropriate equivalents for the elements of style required to convey a modern author's voice and intonation, what I am eventually left with is a whole range of points that require special decisions — like cultural references that are entirely foreign and require explanation or sub-textual assumptions of shared experiences that don't extend from Moscow as far as London (not to mention New York). That's where the ultimate difficulties arise, in deciding which solution to adopt — ignore, modify, omit or substitute."

External links
Amazon list of works by Bromfield
Analysis of Andrew Bromfield's "Night Watch" translation, by M. Desyatova (in Russian)
Analysis of Andrew Bromfield's translations of Victor Pelevin by Irina and Jan Vanhellemont

British translators
Year of birth missing (living people)
Living people
Translators of Alexander Pushkin
Translators of Leo Tolstoy
Russian–English translators